Angola competed at the 2012 Summer Olympics in London, United Kingdom, from 27 July to 12 August 2012. This was the nation's eighth Olympic appearance at the Olympics, except the 1984 Summer Olympics in Los Angeles because of its participation in the Soviet boycott.

Comité Olímpico Angolano sent the nation's largest delegation to the Games, surpassing the Beijing delegation by three athletes. A total of 35 athletes, 5 men and 30 women, competed in 7 sports. For the second time in its history, Angola was represented by more female than male athletes at an Olympic event. Women's basketball and women's handball were the only team-based sports in which Angola had its representation to these Olympic games. The men's national basketball team, however, did not compete at the Olympics for the first time since 1988. Judoka Antonia Moreira was the nation's flag bearer at the opening ceremony. Angola, however, has yet to win its first ever Olympic medal.

Athletics

Men

Women

Basketball

Angola has qualified a women's team.  It will be made up of 12 athletes.

Women's tournament

Roster

Group play

Boxing

Men

Canoeing

Sprint
Angola has qualified a boat for the following event

Qualification Legend: FA = Qualify to final (medal); FB = Qualify to final B (non-medal)

Handball

Angola has qualified a women's team.

 Women's team event – 1 team of 14 players

Women's tournament

Group play

Judo

Swimming

Angolan swimmers have so far achieved qualifying standards in the following events (up to a maximum of 2 swimmers in each event at the Olympic Qualifying Time (OQT), and 1 at the Olympic Selection Time (OST)):

Men

Women

References

External links
 
 

Nations at the 2012 Summer Olympics
2012
Olympics